Rev. László Ladányi (January 14, 1914 - September 23, 1990), in English also spelled Ladány or Ladany, was a Hungarian Jesuit, China watcher, author and editor of China News Analysis, an influential periodical on Chinese affairs.

Biography

Ladányi was born in Diósgyőr, Hungary, in 1914.  He initially wanted to become a violinist and trained as such, but in 1936 he entered the Jesuit order.  He also went to China that year, living first in Peking and then Shanghai.

After the end of the Chinese civil war in 1949 László Ladányi and other Jesuits were forced to flee China, and he settled in Hong Kong. He began publishing China News Analysis in 1953 from the University of Hong Kong, and became well known by China watchers and journalists around the world. Ladányi based his assessments and conclusions mainly on readings of official Chinese documents, and was consistently critical of Communist Party of China rule.

Ladányi, who was variously called a "fanatical anti-Communist" by critics and as "the most exact and consistently correct observer" of mainland Chinese politics by admirers, possessed what Simon Leys called an "uncanny ability" to draw meaning out of often cryptic official Chinese documents.  Jürgen Domes described him as having attained "unprecedented prestige as a China scholar, [...] the doyen of the international community of observers of contemporary Chinese politics".

Publications
Ladányi served as the sole editor of China News Analysis from its founding until 1982, when he left the journal to pursue a career as an author. The Sinologist Simon Leys (pseudonym for the art historian and man of letters, Pierre Ryckmans) gleaned much information from Ladányi's China News Analysis, which he called "super." Leys made frequent use of this material in his 1971 book Les Habits neufs du président Mao. In 1975 that book was awarded the Prix Jean Walter, prix d’histoire et de sociologie by the Académie française and in 1978 it was published in English as The Chairman's New Clothes.

The scholar of Chinese law, Pitman B. Potter reviewed Law and Legality in China Quarterly. He called it "useful and challenging", and found that its use of official Chinese sources gives the analysis a "certain credibility", but tends to present an "overly unified picture" with little indication of policy debates and problems of implementation. Potter adds that this "bleak picture" stands in contrast to the "glowing and somewhat idealistic" presentation of law in traditional China in the beginning of the book, and that Ladányi does not point out the aspects of law in the People's Republic that were not Communist inventions, but present in imperial China's law codes.

Philosophy

In the final edition of China News Analysis for which Ladányi served as editor, he compiled a "ten commandments" describing his philosophy on the study and assessment of contemporary Chinese politics:

Famine mortality estimate
In the August 10, 1962, issue of China News Analysis, Ladányi accurately noted the existence of the massive famine resulting from Mao's Great Leap Forward and offered a "realistic estimate" of 50 million deaths. This was based on letters sent from the Chinese mainland and on refugee reports. Many years later Frank Dikötter was to estimate in his book Mao's Great Famine (2010) a death toll of "at least" 45 million, a close confirmation of Ladányi's figure.

Publications
 China News Analysis, editor, (1953 - 1982)
 The Communist Party of China and Marxism 1921-85: A Self Portrait. London: C. Hurst & Co. Publishers Ltd., 1988; Stanford, Calif: Hoover Institution Press, Stanford University; Hoover Press Publication; 1988.

 The Law and Legality in China: the testament of a China-watcher, edited by Jürgen Domes and Marie-Luise Näth. Honolulu: University of Hawai Press, 1992,  (table of contents) and London: C. Hurst & Co. Publishers Ltd., 1992.

References and further reading

Notes

20th-century Hungarian Jesuits
1914 births
1990 deaths
Hong Kong Jesuits
University of Hong Kong
Hungarian sinologists
20th-century Hungarian historians